Ernst Torgler (25 April 1893 – 19 January 1963) was the last chairman of the Communist Party of Germany (KPD) faction in the German Reichstag before he worked for the Nazis.

Early life
Torgler was born the son of an urban resident in Berlin. There, he attended school from 1904 to 1907, when he joined the Association of Apprentices and Juvenile Workers of Berlin. From 1909 to 1925, he held a variety of different jobs, working most notably as a salesman and accountant. Torgler began his political career in 1910, when he joined the Social Democratic Party. While he served in the military during World War I, Torgler became a member of the Independent Social Democratic Party of Germany in 1917.

Political career
In 1920, Torgler joined the Communist Party of Germany when the Independent Social Democratic Party of Germany merged with the KPD. A year later, Torgler became a city councillor in Berlin-Lichtenberg, a position he held until 1930, and he was elected to the Reichstag in the December 1924 election as a member of the KPD.

Torgler then became deputy chairman of the KPD Reichstag faction in 1927 and chairman in 1929, which made him one of the most powerful members of the party. From 1932 to 1933, Torgler published the KPD Reichstag news-sheet "The Red Voter" with Wilhelm Pieck. Torgler's political career ended in February 1933, however, because of the Reichstag fire.

Reichstag fire
Against the wishes of the KPD leadership, Torgler voluntarily handed himself over to the police on February 28, the day after the fire, when Hermann Göring issued a warrant for his arrest. Torgler was kept in custody, and in July 1933, he was charged with arson and treason. Torgler and his fellow defendants were tried from 21 September to 23 December, when Torgler was acquitted because of a lack of evidence against him.

Work for Nazis
After his trial, Torgler was placed into "protective custody" by the police until 1935. The KPD leadership, now in Brussels as a result of being banned by the Nazis, then stripped Torgler of his party membership and leadership positions because of his surrender to the police.

After his release, he lived just outside Berlin under a pseudonym and worked for the Gestapo. In 1938, Torgler worked for Electrolux and was carefully watched by the SD.

In June 1940, Torgler began working for the Nazi Propaganda Ministry. In 1941, after Nazi Germany invaded the Soviet Union, Torgler worked on anti-Bolshevik propaganda at the behest of Joseph Goebbels. He was then employed as a real estate auditor in the main trust center East in Graudenz, later in Trebbin. In 1944, after the 20 July Plot against Adolf Hitler, an arrest warrant was issued for Torgler. According to his own statements, a personal intervention by Goebbels prevented his imprisonment. With his office he reached Bückeburg in 1945 on the retreat.

Postwar

After World War II, he was denazified and landed a job with the administration of Bückeburg, with help of the US Army. Despite the hard times, Torgler managed to keep himself in a well-paid position. Torgler angrily dismissed charges that he had willingly co-operated with the Nazis.

He tried to join the communists but was rejected. In 1949, he became a member of the Social Democratic Party and in 1950, he moved to Bückeburg, where he drifted into obscurity. He died in Hanover in 1963.

Son
His son, Kurt Torgler (1913–1943), was a witness on behalf of his father at the 1933 countertrial in London that was organised by the German Communist Party on the Reichstag fire. In 1935, he went to the Soviet Union. There, he was arrested by the NKVD in 1937 and sent to a labour camp. After the Hitler-Stalin Pact, he was, in 1940, handed over to the German government. He became a translator in the army and died on the Eastern Front.

References

Sources
Reichstag handbook, 1933

External links
 

1893 births
1963 deaths
Politicians from Berlin
Social Democratic Party of Germany politicians
Independent Social Democratic Party politicians
Communist Party of Germany politicians
People from the Province of Brandenburg
Members of the Reichstag of the Weimar Republic
Gestapo personnel